The Sheffield Declaration, also known as the Sheffield Resolves, was a Colonial American petition against British policies and manifesto for individual rights, drawn up as a series of resolves approved by the Town of Sheffield, Massachusetts, on January 12, 1773 and printed in The Massachusetts Spy, Or, Thomas's Boston Journal on February 18, 1773. The meeting took place in the Colonel John Ashley House, a registered National Historic Landmark in Ashley Falls, a neighborhood of Sheffield, Massachusetts.

The resolves were debated and approved by a committee of eleven local citizens: Deacon Silas Kellog, Col. John Ashley (committee moderator), Dr. Lemuel Bernard,  Aaron Root, Major John Fellows,  Philip Callender, Capt. William Day, Deacon Ebenezer Smith,  Capt. Nathaniel Austin, Capt. Stephen Dewey, and Theodore Sedgwick, who wrote the text.

The Declaration's first resolution was that "Mankind in a state of nature are equal, free, and independent of each other, and have a right to the undisturbed enjoyment of their lives, their liberty and property," These words are echoed in the most famous line of Thomas Jefferson's Declaration of Independence three years later: "We hold these truths to be self-evident, that all men are created equal, that they are endowed by their Creator with certain unalienable Rights, that among these are Life, Liberty and the pursuit of Happiness."

References

Further reading
Brown, Richard D. "Massachusetts Towns Reply to the Boston Committee of Correspondence, 1773". The William and Mary Quarterly, Third Series, Vol. 25, No. 1 (Jan., 1968), pp. 22–39.
Brown, Richard D. Revolutionary politics in Massachusetts: the Boston Committee of Correspondence and the towns, 1772–1774. Cambridge: Harvard University Press, 1970.

Massachusetts in the American Revolution
1773 in the Thirteen Colonies
1773 in Massachusetts
1773 documents
History of Berkshire County, Massachusetts
Sheffield, Massachusetts